Gerd Island is an island  west-southwest of Stene Point at the east side of the entrance to Norway Bight, off the south coast of Coronation Island in the South Orkney Islands. It was charted and named by Norwegian whaling captain Petter Sorlle, who made a running survey of the South Orkney Islands in 1912–13.

See also 
 List of antarctic and sub-antarctic islands

References

Islands of the South Orkney Islands